Qingfeng County is a county located in the northeast of Henan province, bordering the provinces of Hebei to the northwest and Shandong to the east. It is under the administration of the prefecture-level city of Puyang. In the Han Dynasty, Dunqiu County was located somewhere near this area, possibly to the southwest of the modern day county.  At the time, it was a part of Dong Commandery.  Cao Cao was made governor of Dunqiu County, following his assignment as Captain of the Northern District of Luoyang (the capital at that time).

Administrative divisions
As 2012, this county is divided to 5 towns and 12 townships.
Towns

Townships

Climate

References

Romance of the Three Kingdoms/Chapter 1
Cao Cao

County-level divisions of Henan
Puyang